KNCJ (89.5 FM) is a National Public Radio station in Reno, Nevada. Owned and operated by the University of Nevada, Reno, it provides a schedule of classical music and jazz and complements KUNR.

KNCJ signed on December 1, 2016 after the university obtained the station's license from Truckee Meadows Community College. Programming consists of hourly NPR newscasts with most music, mainly classical, coming from the Classical 24 service with jazz from PRI on weekends.

References

External links

NCJ
Radio stations established in 2016
NPR member stations
2016 establishments in Nevada
NCJ
University of Nevada, Reno
Classical music radio stations in the United States
Jazz radio stations in the United States